Maria Angelico is an Australian actress, writer and producer from Melbourne, Victoria. Angelico is best known for her portrayal of Julia Bechly in the TV series Sisters on Network Ten. She is also known for portraying Miss Tan in The InBESTigators.

Career
Angelico made her onscreen acting debut on Blue Heelers as teenager Jassy Kennedy in 2001 and appeared again in that series as Bianca Amalti in 2004. She continued working professionally as an actor throughout her teenage years.
In 2002, Angelico received a place in the inaugural Scholarship course at the Melbourne Theatre Company and studied at the Susan Batson studio in New York, then undertook vocal and dialect training.

In 2015, Angelico wrote, produced and starred in the web series Movement: the web series about a woman named Sophia who needs to sort out her life after making bad decisions and attempting to stay in control, won the 2016 Spotlight on Melbourne WebFest award and was selected for the digital creators showcase at TriBeCa film festival 2016. She appeared as Florence in the web series Other People’s Problems in 2017. Angelico starred in the lead role of Daphna in the stage play Bad Jews which toured nationally in Australia during 2015–2016.

In 2017, Angelico starred as Julia Bechly in the TV drama series Sisters on Network Ten.

Filmography

Film

Television

Web series

Theatre

Awards and nominations

Screen writing

References

External links
   
Maria Angelico’s actor biography at CPM

Social media https://www.instagram.com/mariagloriagraceangelico/?hl=en 

Year of birth missing (living people)
Living people
Australian television actresses
Australian film actresses
Australian screenwriters
Australian stage actresses
21st-century Australian actresses